Viridrillia aureofasciata is a species of sea snail, a marine gastropod mollusk in the family Pseudomelatomidae, the turrids and allies.

Description
The length of the shell attains 14.9 mm, its diameter 5.2 mm.

Distribution
This marine species occurs off Alabama, West Florida and Bahia de Campeche, Mexico.

References

External links
 García E.F. 2008. Eight new molluscan species (Gastropoda: Turridae) from the western Atlantic, with description of two new genera. Novapex 9(1): 1-15

aureofasciata
Gastropods described in 2008